Sir Roger Puleston (1565 – 13 December 1618) was a Welsh politician who sat in the House of Commons at various times between 1584 and 1611.

Puleston was the son of Sir Roger Puleston of Emral. He matriculated at Brasenose College, Oxford, on 27 April 1582. In 1584, he was elected Member of Parliament for Great Bedwyn. He entered the Inner Temple in November 1585. In 1586, he was reelected MP for Great Bedwyn. He was elected MP for Flintshire in 1588 and MP for  Denbighshire in 1593. In 1604, he was elected MP for Flintshire again. He was knighted on 28 August 1617.

Puleston died at the age of about 53.

Puleston married Jane Hanmer daughter of  William Hanmer of Hanmer.

References

 

1565 births
1618 deaths
Members of the Parliament of England (pre-1707) for constituencies in Wales
Alumni of Brasenose College, Oxford
Members of the Inner Temple
People from Flintshire
Members of the Parliament of England for Denbighshire
16th-century Welsh politicians
17th-century Welsh politicians
English MPs 1584–1585
English MPs 1586–1587
English MPs 1589
English MPs 1593
English MPs 1604–1611